Benny Sa, also known as Sa Beining (born 23 March 1976) is a Chinese television host known for his work for China Central Television (CCTV). He served as the one-time anchor of the documentary program Legal Report.

Biography

Early experience 
Sa Beining was born in a military family in Zhanjiang, Guangdong in March 1976, the son of Dèng Yǎjuān, a graduate of Shenyang Conservatory of Music, and Sǎ Shìguì, a Chinese actor in Wuhan Drama Theatre, he has a younger sister: Sǎ Bèinà.  He is of Hui ethnicity.

He started to perform on stage at the age of four, by age eleven, he hosted a house-party with his sister at home.

Sa received his LLM from Peking University in 1998, majoring in Law.

After graduation, he joined the China Central Television, he hosted Legal Report, Shouxi Yehua, Insight, and To Speak. For his work in television he received the 2006 Golden Mike Award and the 2004 Golden Eagle Award for Best Programme Host.

Education experience
During high school Sa expressed his desire to attend the Beijing Film Academy or Central Academy of Drama. In the winter holiday before the National College Entrance Examination, he was allowed to join in the winter camp held by Peking University for his abilities in literature and art. Shortly after that he participated in the centralized exam held by Peking University for students who showed an exceptional performance in the exam, resulting in him gaining his letter of admission from Peking University. Because of this Sa served as a teaching assistant to share his experiences with other students before graduation.

Professional experience 
Sa was selected to host the TV program Legal Report due to the recommendations of his instructors at the Peking University Law School, as a result of his many extra-curriculum experiences and high score. The producers initially wanted a lawyer to host the show but chose to go in a different direction as a lawyer might be too busy to host the program and could lack the qualifications necessary for a host. Sa was aware that his hosting skills were weak, particularly during the early recording stage. He was worried that he would be eliminated due to poor performance and kept trying to determine how others viewed him. Sa practiced his hosting skills every day and was eventually selected as the official host of the program. In the second year after entering the China Central Television, he won the championship in the National TV Host Contest.

Personal life
Sa was in a relationship with Tú Jīngwěi in 2006. They split in 2009. Then Sa reportedly had a whirlwind romance with Cén Lílán. Sa was involved in a relationship with actress Zhang Ziyi beginning in September 2011; they split in 2013.
In 2015, Sa was seen dating Canadian singer Lisa Marie Hoffman (known by her Chinese name 李白, Lǐ Bái). They married on 28 March 2016. In December 2019, the couple welcomed a set of fraternal twins.

Hosting experience

Award records
 2000 The first prize of the China TV Legal System Host Competition
 2000 China TV List Newcomer of the Year Award
 2001 The Most Promising Host Award of the First National College Student TV Festival
 2001 CCTV Top Ten Hosts Online Awards
 2001   "Rongshida" TV host contest gold medal
 2004 CCTV Annual Grade B Moderator
 2005 The 5th Golden Eagle Festival Best National Host
 2005 CCTV Annual Grade B Moderator
 2006 The "Golden Microphone Award" TV broadcast host program award
 2006 CCTV Annual Grade A Moderator
 2007 CCTV Annual Grade A Moderator
 2008 CCTV Annual Grade B Moderator
 2009 CCTV Annual Grade A Moderator
 2010 China University Students TV Festival's most popular male host
 2011 Shanghai TV Festival "Top Ten New Chinese Language Style Hosting" 
 2012 CCTV Annual Grade A Moderator
 2013 The "Golden Microphone Award" from the 2012 China Broadcasting Host
 2016 Top Ten Excellent Announcer and Host Award of CCTV

References

1976 births
People from Zhanjiang
Peking University alumni
Living people
CCTV television presenters
Hui people